The Minister of Justice and Employment used to be a ministerial position inside of the Finnish Government. The portfolio has since been divided into the following:

 Minister of Justice (Finland)
 Minister of Employment (Finland)